Anquan Kenmile Boldin Sr. (born October 3, 1980) is an American former professional football player who was a wide receiver for 14 seasons in the National Football League (NFL). He played college football for the Florida State Seminoles and was drafted by the Arizona Cardinals in the second round of the 2003 NFL draft. He also played for the Baltimore Ravens, San Francisco 49ers and Detroit Lions.

Boldin was the 2003 NFL Offensive Rookie of the Year, was selected to three Pro Bowls and won Super Bowl XLVII with the Baltimore Ravens. In 2015, he was named the Walter Payton Man of the Year for his community service. Despite not being named to the NFL 2000's All-Decade Team, Boldin is widely considered as one of the greatest wide receivers of the 2000's.

High school career
Boldin played football, basketball, and ran track at Pahokee High School. His ability playing as a quarterback led him to be named Florida's Mr. Football in 1998. During his senior season, Pahokee held a 10–0 regular season record including a 34–14 win over Glades Central in the annual Muck Bowl.  After the season, he was a USA Today first-team selection and named Florida Player of the Year.

Also a standout track athlete, Boldin competed in sprinting, jumping and throwing events at Pahokee High. He was timed at 52.34 seconds over 400 meters. In jumps, he recorded a personal-best leap of 6.13 meters in the long jump. As a thrower, he got a top-throw of 13.53 meters in the shot put.

In 2007, he was named to the Florida High School Association All-Century Team, a team compiled of the top 33 players in the 100-year history of high school football in the state of Florida.

College career
Boldin attended Florida State University from 1999 to 2002. He was converted to wide receiver in order to get more playing time. In 23 games at wide receiver, he caught 118 passes for 1,790 yards (averaging 15.2 yards per reception) and 21 touchdowns.

Professional career

2003 NFL Draft
Boldin created initial concerns of the NFL scouts after he registered a relatively slow 4.7 time in the 40-yard dash at the NFL Combine. He was drafted in the second round by the Arizona Cardinals with the 54th overall pick in the 2003 NFL Draft.

Arizona Cardinals
As a rookie, Boldin set an NFL record for most receiving yards by a rookie in his first game (217, which would be his career high in receiving yards for a game), tied Billy Sims for most yards from scrimmage by a rookie in his first game (217), and holds the NFL record for most receptions in the first 26 games of an NFL career (157). He is also the fastest to record 300 career receptions (47 games) and finished the season with 101 catches, 1,377 receiving yards, and eight scores. Boldin was the only rookie selected to the 2004 Pro Bowl.

In 2005, despite missing time with an injury, Boldin still caught more than 100 passes for over 1,400 yards. Arguably his finest moment came against the San Francisco 49ers on December 4 when he broke several tackles and scored the game-winning touchdown in a 17–10 win. That year, he and fellow wide receiver Larry Fitzgerald became only the third duo from the same team to each catch over 100 receptions and top the 1,400-yard mark. They joined Detroit's Herman Moore and Brett Perriman, who accomplished the feat in 1995, and Denver Broncos tandem Ed McCaffrey and Rod Smith, who did it in 2000.

After compiling 83 catches, 1,203 receiving yards and 4 touchdowns in 2006, Boldin was selected to play in his second Pro Bowl.

Boldin was named the offensive captain for the Cardinals for the 2007 season; during the season, he became the fastest player in NFL history to compile 400 career receptions.

On September 28, 2008, Boldin was carted off the field after a violent helmet-to-helmet collision in the end zone with 27 seconds remaining in the Cardinals' 56–35 loss to the New York Jets. While attempting to catch a long pass from Kurt Warner, Boldin was hit in the back by free safety Kerry Rhodes and then took an illegal helmet-to-face shot from strong safety Eric Smith, knocking them both unconscious. Smith was able to get up after a few moments. After several minutes, Boldin was placed on a stretcher and carted off the field. Smith was fined $50,000 and suspended one game. Boldin left the game having caught 10 balls for 119 yards and a touchdown.  On October 4, 2008, coach Ken Whisenhunt announced that Boldin would be out for an indefinite time period with fractured paranasal sinuses. Boldin returned three weeks later and caught 9 passes for 63 yards and two touchdowns against the Carolina Panthers. Fitzgerald and Steve Breaston, who filled in for the injured Boldin, became the fifth 1,000 yard receiving trio in NFL history.

In December 2008, he became the fastest player in NFL history to have 500 receptions. On January 3, 2009, in his first post-season game, against the Atlanta Falcons in the wildcard round, Boldin had a 71-yard catch and run for a touchdown. In the Super Bowl XLIII loss to the Pittsburgh Steelers, Boldin caught 8 passes for 84 yards.

On May 26, 2009, according to ESPN's Mike Sando, Anquan Boldin fired agent Drew Rosenhaus. He later hired agent Tom Condon.

On November 15, 2009 in a game against the Seattle Seahawks, Boldin became the fifth-fastest NFL player to record 7,000 receiving yards.

Baltimore Ravens

2010 season
 
On March 5, 2010, Boldin was traded to the Baltimore Ravens for the Ravens third and fourth round picks in the 2010 NFL Draft. The Ravens also received a fifth round pick from the Cardinals as part of the deal. Boldin agreed to a three-year deal worth $25 million, in addition to the one year he had left on his then-current deal, bringing the total deal to $28 million over 4 years, with $10 million guaranteed.

In Boldin's Week 1 debut as a Raven, he caught seven passes for 110 yards, and was one of the few offensive players with strong contributions in the 10-9 defensive game eventually won by Baltimore.

In Week 3, against the division rival Cleveland Browns, Boldin caught eight passes for 142 yards and three touchdowns. He became the fastest player in NFL history to reach 600 receptions, doing so in just 98 games. Boldin won AFC Offensive Player of the Week honors for his performance.

Three weeks later, the Ravens traveled to New England to take on the New England Patriots. Boldin had four catches for 63 yards and a touchdown, but the Ravens eventually lost in overtime. One week later, the Ravens took on another AFC East team, the Buffalo Bills. He caught six passes for 92 yards and a 34-yard flea-flicker touchdown in the 37–34 shootout win. He also had five catches for 50 yards and a touchdown in a week 10 Thursday Night Football loss to the Atlanta Falcons.

The Ravens faced their arch-rivals, the Pittsburgh Steelers, in Week 13 on Sunday Night Football. Boldin was the game's leading receiver with five catches, 118 yards, a 61-yard catch and a touchdown in Baltimore's 13–10 loss.

Boldin scored 7 touchdowns in his first year with the Ravens. He had 837 yards through the air as well, on 64 receptions.

In the Wildcard round of the playoffs, the Ravens took on the Kansas City Chiefs. Boldin caught five passes for 64 yards and a touchdown in the 30–7 rout. The following week, Boldin would only record one reception for -2 yards as the Ravens had their season ended by another loss to the Steelers.

2011 season
In Week 1, Boldin led the Ravens with four catches, 74 yards and the game's opening touchdown, as the Ravens got redemption on their rival Steelers with a 35-7 blowout win.

Boldin had eight catches for 132 yards in a Week 6 victory over the Houston Texans. The next week, on Monday Night Football against the Jacksonville Jaguars, Boldin had four receptions, 40 yards and a touchdown. He continued his strong level of play the following week, catching seven passes for a season-high 145 yards as he helped the Ravens put together their biggest comeback win ever against his former team, the Arizona Cardinals

Boldin scored his final touchdown of the season in Week 11 against the rival Bengals, a 35-yard catch that was his only reception of the game. Boldin finished the regular season as the Ravens leading receiver once again, catching 57 passes for 887 yards, topping his total from 2011, but also had four fewer touchdowns, only scoring three on the year.

In the Divisional round of the playoffs, Boldin and the Ravens faced the Texans once again. He had four catches for 73 yards and a touchdown. He also caught a much-needed pass on the sideline with one hand. The Ravens would win 20-13 and move on to the AFC Championship Game.

Boldin had six catches for 101 yards in the AFC Championship game against the Patriots, but the Ravens eventually lost after a dropped touchdown pass by Lee Evans and a missed field goal by Billy Cundiff.

2012 season
Boldin began his 2012 campaign with four catches for 63 yards and a touchdown, while also carrying the ball once for three yards, as the Ravens beat the Bengals 44–13. In a Week 4 primetime win against the Browns, Boldin had a regular season-high nine catches for 131 yards. He had 82 yards the next week in a win over the Chiefs and 98 yards the following week in a victory over the Cowboys.

Boldin had three more touchdowns in the regular season, scoring one against the Steelers in Week 13 (he also had 81 yards receiving) and two against the Redskins the following week (along with 78 yards in the air). He had seven catches for 93 yards in Week 16 when the Ravens clinched their division for the second straight year.

Boldin finished the 2012 regular season leading the Ravens in receiving yards for the third consecutive year. He caught 65 passes for 921 yards and four touchdowns.

In the Wild Card Round of the 2012 Playoffs, Boldin had one of his best postseason performances as a Raven. He caught a 46-yard pass and an 18-yard touchdown pass from Joe Flacco in a 24–9 win over the Indianapolis Colts. He also set a franchise record of 145 receiving yards in a postseason game. In the Divisional playoff game against the Denver Broncos, Boldin caught six passes for 71 yards as he helped the Ravens pull off a 38–35 upset win. In the AFC Championship game, Boldin had five catches for 60 yards and a pair of scores as the Ravens defeated the Patriots 28–13.

Boldin got his first championship title as the Ravens defeated the 49ers by a score of 34–31 in Super Bowl XLVII. He had six receptions for a total of 104 yards, scored one touchdown and had a long reception of 30 yards. His Super Bowl performance was ranked 31st among all wide receiver performances and 13th in the AFC alone. He finished the postseason with 22 receptions, 380 yards and four touchdowns.

On the NFL's annual Top 100 Players list, Boldin was ranked number 93.

San Francisco 49ers
On March 11, 2013, Boldin was traded to the San Francisco 49ers for a sixth-round pick in the 2013 NFL Draft.
On September 8, 2013, in the season opener against the Green Bay Packers which was also his debut game as a 49er, the 49ers defeated the Packers 34–28. Boldin racked up 208 yards and a touchdown on 13 receptions during that game. His week one performance earned him NFC Offensive Player of the Week. He also became the first wide receiver to ever gain over 100 yards for 3 different teams on the team debut matches. Boldin finished the first year with the 49ers with 85 receptions and 1,179 yards as well as 7 touchdowns.

On March 3, 2014, it was announced that Boldin and the 49ers had agreed on a new two-year, $12 million contract, keeping Boldin in San Francisco.

On December 6, 2015, Boldin surpassed 13,000 career receiving yards in a week 13 game against the Chicago Bears. Boldin caught 5 passes for 37 yards in the win.

Detroit Lions
On July 28, 2016, Boldin signed with the Detroit Lions. He chose to wear 80 rather than 81 out of respect for the recently retired Calvin Johnson.

On September 11, 2016, Boldin caught three passes for 35 yards in the season opening victory against the Indianapolis Colts. His 35 yards give him 13,230 yards for his career, moving ahead of Andre Reed for No. 16 all-time. On September 18, 2016, Boldin caught his 75th career touchdown (and first with the Lions) against the Tennessee Titans. On October 23, 2016, Boldin caught the game-winning touchdown with 19 seconds left against the Washington Redskins. On November 6, 2016, Boldin caught his fifth touchdown of the season against the Minnesota Vikings. On November 24, 2016, Boldin caught seven passes for 69 yards and a touchdown against the Minnesota Vikings. Boldin recorded a 2-yard touchdown and a 9-yard reception. On December 11, 2016, Boldin's three receptions against the Chicago Bears, including a 16-yard second quarter TD, gave him 1,064 catches for his career, moving him into 10th all time, passing Andre Johnson. Boldin finished the season with 67 receptions on 95 targets for 584 yards and eight touchdowns. His 15 red zone receptions ranked No. 2 among NFL wide receivers in 2016.

Buffalo Bills and retirement
On August 7, 2017, Boldin signed a one-year contract with the Buffalo Bills. However, on August 20, 2017, less than two weeks after joining the team, Boldin abruptly retired, saying "his life's purpose is bigger than football" and he intended to focus on humanitarian work.

Boldin would hold an official retirement ceremony with the Baltimore Ravens on October 14, 2019.

NFL records
 Most receiving yards in first career game: 217
 Most receptions in the first 26 games of an NFL career: 157
 Fastest to record 200 career receptions (in 34 games) - since broken by Odell Beckham Jr. (30 games)
 Fastest to record 300 career receptions (in 47 games) - since broken by Odell Beckham Jr. (45 games)
 Fastest to record 400 career receptions (in 67 games)
 Fastest to record 500 career receptions (in 80 games) - since tied by Julio Jones

Cardinals franchise records
 Most receiving yards per game average in a season: 100.1 (2005)
 Most receptions per game average in a season: 7.4 (2008)
 Most receptions per game average (career): 6.2

Ravens franchise records 
 Most post-season receiving yards in a game: 145

NFL career statistics

Regular season

Personal life
Boldin has a brother, DJ Boldin, who was an offensive assistant for the San Francisco 49ers and is the head football coach at NCAA Division II Lake Erie College. Boldin's first son, Anquan, Jr., was born in 2004 and his second son, Ashton Boldin, was born in 2010. One of his cousins was Corey Jones.

Boldin is a Christian. With the Baltimore Ravens, Boldin would often lead Bible study in the locker room.

Boldin established the Anquan Boldin Foundation aka Q81 Foundation in 2004. The Foundation is dedicated to expanding the educational and life opportunities of underprivileged children and has a track record for sustaining programs in multiple cities. As evidenced by the charitable activities in Arizona, Baltimore and Boldin's home state of Florida, the Q81 Foundation has its annual Q-Festival Weekend, Holiday Turkey Drive and Shopping Spree, and Q81 Summer Enrichment Program partnered with Florida Crystals  The Foundation exercises scholarship and dental programs for children. It also serves the community by rewarding great scholastic and community achievement in youth.

In March 2012, Boldin and former Cardinals teammate Larry Fitzgerald went to Ethiopia, where they volunteered to move rocks to create arable land.

References

External links

Official website

San Francisco 49ers biography
Baltimore Ravens biography

1980 births
Living people
Players of American football from Florida
People from Pahokee, Florida
African-American players of American football
American football quarterbacks
American football wide receivers
Florida State Seminoles football players
Arizona Cardinals players
Baltimore Ravens players
San Francisco 49ers players
Sportspeople from the Miami metropolitan area
Detroit Lions players
National Conference Pro Bowl players
National Football League Offensive Rookie of the Year Award winners
Buffalo Bills players
Pahokee High School alumni
21st-century African-American sportspeople
20th-century African-American people
10,000 receiving yards club
Ed Block Courage Award recipients